Year 1384 (MCCCLXXXIV) was a leap year starting on Friday (link will display the full calendar) of the Julian calendar.

Events 
 January–December 
 May – September 3 – Siege of Lisbon by the Castilian army, during the 1383–85 Crisis in Portugal.
 August 16 – The Hongwu Emperor of Ming China hears a case of a couple who tore paper money notes, while fighting over them. Under the law, this is considered to be destroying stamped government documents, which is to be punished by a caning with a bamboo rod of 100 strokes. However, the Emperor decides to pardon them, on the grounds that it was unintentional.
 November 16 – 10-year-old Jadwiga is crowned "King" of Poland in Kraków following the death of her father, King Louis, in 1382.
 December 25 – Use of the Spanish era dating system in the Crown of Castile is suppressed.

Unknown Date
 The Hongwu Emperor of China reinstates the Imperial examination system for drafting scholar-officials to the civil service, after suspending the system since 1373, in favor of a recommendation system to office.
 The Nasrid princes of Al-Andalus replace Abu al-Abbas with Abu Faris Musa ibn Faris, as ruler of the Marinid dynasty in modern-day Morocco.
 Zain Al-Abidin succeeds his father, Shah Shuja, as ruler of the Muzaffarids in central Persia.
 Shortly before his death, John Wycliffe sends out tracts against Pope Urban VI, who has not turned out to be the reformist Wycliffe had hoped.
 Qara Muhammad succeeds Bairam Khawaja, as ruler of the Kara Koyunlu ("Black Sheep Turkomans"), in modern-day Armenia and northern Iraq.
 Timur conquers the northern territories of the Jalayirid Empire, in western Persia.
 Katharine Lady Berkeley's School is founded in Gloucestershire, England.

Births 
 January 6 – Edmund Holland, 4th Earl of Kent (d. 1408)
 August – Antoine, Duke of Brabant (d. 1415)
 August 11 – Yolande of Aragon (d. 1442)
 date unknown
 St Frances of Rome (d. 1440)
 Khalil Sultan, ruler of Transoxiana (d. 1411)
 Sigismondo Polcastro, Italian physician and natural philosopher (d. 1473)

Deaths 
 January 30 – Louis II, Count of Flanders (b. 1330)
 May – William Douglas, 1st Earl of Douglas, Scottish magnate (b.c. 1327)
 June 8 – Kan'ami, Japanese actor and playwright (b. 1333)
 August 6 – Francesco I of Lesbos
 August 20 – Geert Groote, Dutch founder of the Brethren of the Common Life (b. 1340)
 September 10 – Joanna of Dreux, Countess of Penthievre and nominal Duchess of Brittany (b. 1319)
 September 20 – Louis I, Duke of Anjou (b. 1339)
 October – Joan Holland, Duchess of Brittany (b. 1350)
 December 23 – Thomas Preljubović, ruler of Epirus
 December 31 – John Wycliffe, English theologian, Bible translator and Catholic reform campaigner
 date unknown
 John of Fordun, Scottish chronicler
 Peter of Enghien, Count of Lecce
 Ruaidri mac Tairdelbach Ó Conchobair, King of Connacht
 probable – Liubartas, King of Galicia
 Muhammad Jamaluddin al-Makki al-Amili al-Jizzini known as al-Shahid al-Awwal. Author of Al-Lum'a al-Dimashqiyya (book) (b. ca 1334)

References